Živko Kostadinović (born 10 April 1992) is a Bosnian professional footballer who plays as a goalkeeper for Zürich.

Career
Kostadinović is a product of the youth academy of Lausanne-Sport, before beginning his senior career with Stade Nyonnais in 2011. The next year, he moved to Vaduz, before again moving to Schaffhausen in 2013. He had a brief stint with Le Mont, before transferring to FC Wil in 2018 where he became starter. On 2 August 2020 after 149 games in the Swiss Challenge League, he transferred to the Swiss Super League club FC Zürich until the summer of 2022. On 11 February 2022, he extended his contract with Zürich until the summer of 2024. He helped Zürich win the 2021–22 Swiss Super League.

International career
Kostadinović was born in Bosnia and Herzegovina and is of Serbian descent, and moved to Switzerland at a young age. He was called up as a backup goalkeeper for the Switzerland U20s in 2012, without making an appearance.

Honours
Vaduz
 Liechtenstein Football Cup: 2012–13

Zürich
 Swiss Super League: 2021–22

References

External links
 
 SFL Profile

1992 births
Living people
People from Modriča
Bosnia and Herzegovina footballers
Swiss men's footballers
Bosnia and Herzegovina emigrants to Switzerland
Serbs of Bosnia and Herzegovina
Swiss people of Bosnia and Herzegovina descent
Swiss people of Serbian descent
Association football goalkeepers
FC Stade Nyonnais players
FC Zürich players
FC Vaduz players
FC Schaffhausen players
SC Young Fellows Juventus players
FC Le Mont players
FC Wil players
Swiss Super League players
Swiss Challenge League players
Swiss Promotion League players
Bosnia and Herzegovina expatriate footballers
Bosnia and Herzegovina expatriate sportspeople in Liechtenstein
Swiss expatriate footballers
Swiss expatriate sportspeople in Liechtenstein
Expatriate footballers in Liechtenstein